Támara Echegoyen Domínguez (born 17 February 1984 in Ourense) is a Spanish sailor. She participated at the 2012 Summer Olympics in Elliott 6m class, and together with her crew, gasts Ángela Pumariega and Sofía Toro, won the gold medal. In 2017–18, she was a crewmember on Mapfre on legs 1, 2, 3 in the Volvo Ocean Race.

See also
 List of Olympic medalists in sailing

Notes

References

External links
 
 
 

1984 births
Living people
Spanish female sailors (sport)
Olympic sailors of Spain
Olympic gold medalists for Spain
Olympic medalists in sailing
Sailors at the 2012 Summer Olympics – Elliott 6m
Sailors at the 2016 Summer Olympics – 49er FX
Sailors at the 2020 Summer Olympics – 49er FX
Medalists at the 2012 Summer Olympics
49er FX class sailors
49er FX class world champions
World champions in sailing for Spain
Volvo Ocean Race sailors
Sportspeople from Ourense
Sportspeople from Galicia (Spain)